Tough Tenor Favorites is an album by saxophonists Eddie "Lockjaw" Davis and Johnny Griffin recorded in 1962 and released on the Jazzland label.

Reception
The AllMusic site awarded the album 4 stars stating "Johnny Griffin and Eddie "Lockjaw" Davis, the two "tough tenors" in question, always made for an exciting team... The main winner in these fiery tenor "battles" is the listener".

Track listing 
 "Bahia" (Ary Barroso)   
 "Blue Lou" (Irving Mills, Edgar Sampson)  
 "How Am I to Know?" (Jack King)  
 "Ow!" (Dizzy Gillespie)  
 "I Wished on the Moon" (Dorothy Parker, Ralph Rainger)  
 "Tin Tin Deo" (Gil Fuller, Dizzy Gillespie, Chano Pozo)  
 "From This Moment On" (Cole Porter)

Personnel 
 Eddie "Lockjaw" Davis, Johnny Griffin - tenor saxophone
 Horace Parlan - piano
 Buddy Catlett - bass
 Ben Riley - drums

References 

1962 albums
Johnny Griffin albums
Eddie "Lockjaw" Davis albums
Jazzland Records (1960) albums